Pierrot Dancin' is the seventh album of Japanese rock band, Granrodeo. It was released on 8 February 2017.

Song information
 "Punky Funky Love" was used as the 1st opening theme to the 2015 anime television Kuroko's Basketball 3.
 "Memories" was used as the 3rd opening theme to the 2015 anime television Kuroko's Basketball 3.
 "TRASH CANDY" was used as the opening theme to the 2016 anime television series Bungō Stray Dogs.
 "Shounen no Hate" was used as the 1st ending theme to the second season of the 2016 anime television series Mobile Suit Gundam: Iron-Blooded Orphans.

Track listing

Personnel
 Kishow: vocals, lyrics
 E-Zuka: lead guitar, backing vocals, Arranging

Cover 
"Punky Funky Love" was covered by BERRY GOODMAN respectively, on the 2020 Granrodeo tribute album Rodeo Freak.

References
Official mobile site

2017 albums
Granrodeo albums